Jersey College is a private career college specializing in nursing education with its main campus in Teterboro, New Jersey.  The college was established in 2003 and started its first class in 2004. Jersey College has thirteen other locations in New Jersey, Florida, Indiana, Arizona, and Tennessee.

History 
Established in 2003, Jersey College's nursing school was founded in New Jersey by Greg Karzhevsky and originally called The Center for Allied Health & Nursing Education. The aim of the institution was to develop highly trained and skilled nurses to work at New Jersey's largest home care agency operated by the Karzhevsky family. 

In 2004, The Center was approved by the New Jersey Board of Nursing to offer a Practical Nursing Program. The Center expanded its student body and increased its staff of instructors and administrators.

In 2007, following its national accreditation from The Council on Occupational Education and approval from the United States Department of Education, the school opened a second campus in Tampa, FL. The South Jersey campus in Ewing, NJ opened shortly after in 2009. The school was awarded approval for a Professional Nursing Program in 2010 and opened the Jacksonville campus. The Fort Lauderdale campus was created in 2012.

In November of that year, the school received approval from the New Jersey Commission on Higher Education and the New Jersey Board of Nursing to offer a Registered Nursing Program with an associate degree. The Center for Allied Health and Nursing Education changed its name to Jersey College to coincide with the pursuit of higher education opportunities. The college has produced more than 10,000 graduates in the nursing field.

In July 2014, the Jersey College campus at Tampa, Florida expanded to a 40,000 square foot facility in Sabal Park, that includes two floors of observation rooms, computer labs, simulation labs, classrooms, a library, and a cafeteria.

In 2016, Jersey College added its sixth campus through a collaboration with Largo Hospital by establishing a campus inside of the Indian Rocks campus of Largo Hospital in Largo, Florida.

In 2020, Jersey College added its seventh campus through a collaboration with Community Health Systems at Bayfront Health Port Charlotte in Port Charlotte, Florida. The campus is located on the grounds of the hospital and hosts the Hospital-Based nursing track of the Professional Nursing program.

In 2021, Jersey College added its eighth campus through a collaboration with Community Health Systems and Lutheran Health Network at Lutheran Hospital of Indiana in Fort Wayne, Indiana. The campus is located on the grounds of the hospital and hosts the Hospital-Based nursing track of the Professional Nursing program

In 2022, Jersey College added its three additional campuses through a collaboration with Community Health Systems at Bravera Health Brooksville in Brooksville, Florida; at Physicians Regional Medical Center in Naples, Florida; and at Tennova Healthcare - Cleveland in Cleveland, Tennessee. The campuses are located on the grounds of the hospitals and host the Hospital-Based nursing track of the Professional Nursing program.

In 2023, Jersey College added three additional campuses in collaboration with Northwest Healthcare in Tucson, Arizona; Commonwealth Health in Scranton, Pennsylvania; and Melbourne Regional Medical Center in Melbourne, Florida.

Campuses 
Jersey College has ten locations in New Jersey, Florida, and Indiana:

Teterboro, New Jersey (main campus)
Brooksville, Florida
Cleveland, Tennessee
Ewing, New Jersey
Fort Lauderdale, Florida
Fort Wayne, Indiana
Jacksonville, Florida
Largo, Florida
Melbourne, Florida
Naples, Florida
Port Charlotte, Florida
Scranton, Pennsylvania
Tampa, Florida
Tucson, Arizona

Academics 
Jersey College offers two programs. The Practical Nursing or "LPN" Program prepares students for careers in Licensed Practical Nursing. The program includes theoretical instruction on the foundations of practical nursing and clinical experience in practicing patient care. The program covers basic anatomy, disease processes, medications, treatments, care planning, and preparation for NCLEX-PN licensing examination.

The Professional Nursing or "RN" Program is for students starting their nursing education who aim to become registered nurses or for Licensed Practical Nurses seeking to continue their education. Certain campuses also offer the RN program in a Hospital-Based option. Graduates receive either an Associate of Applied Science (AAS) degree in Nursing or an Associate of Science (AS)  degree in Nursing. The program covers medical-surgical, geriatric, maternal, pediatric, and mental health topics as well as preparation for the NCLEX-RN examination.

Accreditation and licensing
Jersey College has received accreditation and licensing from the following organizations:

 2004 New Jersey Board of Nursing
 2007 Council on Occupational Education
 2008 Florida Board of Nursing
 2008 Florida Commission for Independent Education
 2012 New Jersey Commission on Higher Education
 2018 Accreditation Commission for Education in Nursing,
 Associate Degree (RN) Program, Fort Lauderdale Campus
 Associate Degree (RN) Program, Jacksonville Campus
 Associate Degree (RN) Program, Tampa Campus
 Associate Degree (RN) Program, Teterboro Campus
 Associate Degree (RN) Program, Ewing Campus
 Associate Degree (RN) Program, Largo Campus
 2020 Indiana Commission for Higher Education
 2021 Indiana State Board of Nursing
 2022 Tennessee Higher Education Commission
 2022 Tennessee Board of Nursing
 2022 Arizona State Board for Private Postsecondary Education

References

External links

Nursing schools in New Jersey
Nursing schools in Florida
Education in Bergen County, New Jersey
Education in Mercer County, New Jersey
Ewing Township, New Jersey
Education in Fort Lauderdale, Florida
Education in Jacksonville, Florida
Education in Tampa, Florida
2003 establishments in New Jersey
Private universities and colleges in Florida
Private universities and colleges in New Jersey
Universities and colleges in Bergen County, New Jersey